Bilateral diplomatic relations exist between Armenia and Tajikistan. The two countries are in a number of international and regional organizations, such as the United Nations, the Commonwealth of Independent States, the Collective Security Treaty Organization, and the Eurasian Economic Union. Armenia is represented in Tajikistan through its embassy in Ashgabat, Turkmenistan and has an honorary consulate in Dushanbe. Tajikistan is represented in Armenia through its embassy in Moscow, Russia. There is a small community of Armenians in Tajikistan, with many of the original population having left the country following the collapse of the Soviet Union and the following civil war in Tajikistan.

History 
The first Armenians are believed to have arrived in Tajikistan in the 1930s. Many anti-Armenian prejudice occurred by the start of the 1990s, such as the 1990 Dushanbe riots which were sparked by an unfounded rumour that Armenian refugees would be resettled there and get free housing during a housing shortages.

Diplomatic relations were established on 12 October 1992. The founding document for diplomatic relations was the Treaty of Friendship and Cooperation between the Republic of Tajikistan and the Republic of Armenia.

Cultural relations 
There is currently one Armenian cultural union in the country, called the Mesrop Mashtots Armenian Community formed in Dushanbe in 1989. It was founded and led by honored coach of the Tajik SSR Telman Gurgen Voskanyan for 20 years. An Armenian day school and dance ensemble were founded in 2009.

Economic relations 
Coordinating economic relations between Tajikistan and  Armenia is the Tajik-Armenian Intergovernmental Commission on Trade and Economic Cooperation. In 1994, the volume of foreign trade turnover was equal to 239,000 US dollars. In 2000, it amounted to only 1,000 dollars. In 2014, the volume of trade between the countries amounted to almost 1 million US dollars.

High-level mutual state visits

See also

 Foreign relations of Armenia
 Foreign relations of Tajikistan 
 Armenians in Tajikistan

References

 
Tajikistan
Bilateral relations of Tajikistan